This page covers all relevant details regarding PFC Cherno More Varna for all official competitions inside the 2010–11 season. These are A PFG and Bulgarian Cup.

Club

Transfer news
On 18 May, Stanislav Stoyanov, who joined the club in the summer of 1999, signed a new one-year contract extension with Cherno More. The midfielder is now linked to the club until June 2011. On 31 May, the Sailors addressed that Beroe's left-winger Doncho Atanasov signed a two-year contract with the club on a free transfer. A two days later the club of Varna announced that defensive midfielder Dimitar Petkov signed a two-year deal from Lokomotiv Mezdra. On 8 June, Cherno More confirmed that Atanas Bornosuzov, midfielder formed at the club, signed a two-year contract with Romanian side Astra Ploieşti on a free transfer. On 14 June, Montana announced the signing of Cherno More Georgi Avramov. A two days later, the Sailors reported that Freamunde defender Marco Tiago who terminated his contract with Portuguese club signed a 24-month contract. On June 28, 2010, Brazilian striker Mário Jardel signed a one year contract with the Sailors and was officially presented as a new signing of the club.

Squad changes
In:

Total spending:  €0
{|

Out:

Total income:  €250,000

References

PFC Cherno More Varna seasons
Cherno More Varna